Pavel Gajdoš (1 October 1936 – 6 December 2022) was a Czech gymnast. He competed for Czechoslovakia at the 1960 Summer Olympics and the 1964 Summer Olympics.

Gajdoš died on 6 December 2022, at the age of 86.

References

External links
 

1936 births
2022 deaths
Czech male artistic gymnasts
Olympic gymnasts of Czechoslovakia
Gymnasts at the 1960 Summer Olympics
Gymnasts at the 1964 Summer Olympics
People from Zakarpattia Oblast